The Union of Soviet Socialist Republics made its Summer Paralympic début at the 1988 Summer Paralympics in Seoul. This was not only its first, but also its last appearance in the Summer Paralympics before its dissolution. The country participated only in athletics and swimming events. Soviet competitors won 56 medals, of which 21 gold.

Vadim Kalmykov, with four gold medals in track and field, was the USSR's most successful athlete at the Games.

Medalists

See also
Soviet Union at the Paralympics
Soviet Union at the 1988 Summer Olympics

External links
International Paralympic Committee

References

Nations at the 1988 Summer Paralympics
1988
Paralympics